"Come a Little Bit Closer" is a song by the 1960s rock and roll band Jay and the Americans. It reached number 3 on the Billboard Hot 100 on November 21, 1964, making it the band's highest-charting single. It also peaked at number 4 on the Cashbox chart and at number 1 on RPM's singles chart. The single served as a comeback for the group, who had not had a hit in some time.

It was written by songwriters Tommy Boyce and Bobby Hart, as well as Wes Farrell, and became Boyce and Hart's first top 10 hit.

Jay and the Americans also recorded a Spanish version of the song.

In other media
The song is featured in the 2017 film Guardians of the Galaxy Vol. 2.

References

1964 singles
1964 songs
1977 singles
Columbia Records singles
Janie Fricke songs
Jay and the Americans songs
Johnny Duncan (country singer) songs
RPM Top Singles number-one singles
song recordings produced by Artie Ripp
song recordings produced by Billy Sherrill
songs written by Bobby Hart
songs written by Tommy Boyce
songs written by Wes Farrell
United Artists Records singles